In elementary number theory, a highly powerful number is a positive integer that satisfies a property introduced by the Indo-Canadian mathematician Mathukumalli V. Subbarao. The set of highly powerful numbers is a proper subset of the set of powerful numbers.

Define prodex(1) = 1. Define . The positive integer  is defined to be a highly powerful number if and only if, for every positive integer  implies that 

The first 25 highly powerful numbers are: 1, 4, 8, 16, 32, 64, 128, 144, 216, 288, 432, 864, 1296, 1728, 2592, 3456, 5184, 7776, 10368, 15552, 20736, 31104, 41472, 62208, 86400.

References

Integer sequences